Ambroise Chevreux (13 February 1728, in Orléans – 2 September 1792, in Paris) was a French Benedictine.  He was the last superior general of the Congregation of Saint Maur.

References

Clergy from Orléans
1728 births
1792 deaths
French beatified people
French Benedictines
Congregation of Saint-Maur
French clergy killed in the French Revolution